Sascha Risch (born 13 April 2000) is a German professional footballer who plays as a left-back for SV Meppen.

Career statistics

References

External links
 
 

2000 births
Living people
German footballers
Association football fullbacks
3. Liga players
Regionalliga players
SC Freiburg players
SC Freiburg II players
SV Meppen players